Higaonna is a Japanese surname. Notable people with the surname include:

, founder of Gojū Ryū karate-do
Higaonna Kanryu (1849–1922), calligrapher and martial arts practitioner
, Gojū Ryū practitioner, chief instructor of IOGKF

Japanese-language surnames